Forever and a Day is a 2011 Filipino romance film starring Sam Milby and KC Concepcion. The film was released by Star Cinema. The film premiered on June 15, 2011.

Plot
Eugene (Sam Milby) arrives in Bukidnon with only one intention: to forget his problems at work. But when he meets Raffy (KC Concepcion) and as they travel and go on ridiculous and death-defying activities together, they start to form a friendship that goes beyond Eugene’s original plan. Raffy helps Eugene appreciate himself more and to look at things in a positive way. With Raffy, Eugene begins to believe in himself again. Soon, against his own expectations, he admits to himself that has fallen in love with this girl.

But life is truly ironic. The moment Eugene expresses his feelings for her, Raffy suddenly starts to push him away. She admits that he can never have her, and she doesn’t want Eugene to hope for a happy ending with her, because she cannot be loved.

Now, it is Eugene’s turn to make Raffy believe in love again, just as how she reminded him to believe in himself. But is faith enough to change the course of their destiny? And is his love strong enough for him to sacrifice everything for a relationship that will not last, and for a girl who will leave him soon?

Cast
Sam Milby as Eugene
KC Concepcion as Raffy
Rayver Cruz as Miko
Bembol Roco as Gerry
Dante Rivero as Tatang
Vivian Velez as Ellen
Matet de Leon as Cam
Spanky Manikan as Eugene's Dad
Bing Pimentel as Eugene's Mom
Lui Villaruz as Tupe
Robin Da Rosa as Eugene's Brother
Helga Krapf as Eugene's Sister
Nikki Valdez as Steff
Janet Dangcalan as Melinda

Production

Location
The film was shot in the Cities of Iligan and Cagayan de Oro and the province of Bukidnon in the Philippines.

Music
Sam Milby recorded a cover of "All My Life" which was originally sung by America which is used as the film's theme song. A music video were released on Star Cinema's official YouTube account.

Reception

Launch
The film's teaser was  released on May 11, 2011 before the showing of the also Star Cinema produced, In The Name of Love.

Box Office
The film achieved moderate success. The film opened its first week with a P23 million gross receipts, according to Box Office Mojo. Its total gross is P44.73M.

Awards

References

External links
 

2011 films
Films directed by Cathy Garcia-Molina
2010s Tagalog-language films
Star Cinema films
Philippine romance films